Major General George William Weightman (born June 15, 1951) was a U.S. Army Family Medicine physician who was commander of the North Atlantic Regional Medical Command and Walter Reed Army Medical Center (WRAMC). He was relieved of his WRAMC command on March 1, 2007, in the wake of the Walter Reed Army Medical Center neglect scandal. He took command of the U.S. Army Medical Research and Materiel Command in November 2007 and retired from active duty on 31 March 2009.

Biography
Weightman is a native of Eden Mills, Vermont. He received his Bachelor of Science Degree from the United States Military Academy at West Point, New York in 1973 and was commissioned as a Lieutenant of Infantry and stationed at Schofield Barracks, Hawaii, where he served in the 1st Battalion, 35th Infantry, 25th Infantry Division. He was awarded a Doctorate of Medicine degree from the University of Vermont College of Medicine in 1982 and completed his Family Practice residency training at Eisenhower Army Medical Center, Fort Gordon, Georgia. He was then assigned to Keller Army Community Hospital at West Point, New York, where he served as Chief, Department of Primary Care and Community Medicine. In 1989, he became the 82nd Airborne Division Surgeon and served with the All Americans during Operations Just Cause and Desert Shield/Storm.

Subsequently, he served as Family Practice Residency Director at Womack Army Medical Center before commanding the Medical Element, Joint Task Force Bravo, Soto Cano, Honduras. He then commanded the McDonald Army Community Hospital, Fort Eustis, Virginia and the 30th Medical Brigade in Heidelberg, Germany. In July 1999, he became the Chief of the Medical Corps Branch at United States Army Personnel Command, Alexandria, Virginia. From May 2002 to October 2002, MG Weightman served as Assistant Surgeon General for Force Projection and then he was the Commanding General, 3rd Medical Command (Forward), and Coalition Forces Land Component Command Surgeon for Operation Iraqi Freedom. He later served as Commanding General, 44th Medical Command/Corps Surgeon, XVIII Airborne Corps at Fort Bragg, North Carolina. MG Weightman assumed command of the North Atlantic Regional Medical Command and Walter Reed Army Medical Center on August 25, 2006. He served as the Commander, U.S. Army Medical Department Center and School and Fort Sam Houston, San Antonio, Texas from August 2004 until July 2006. He commanded the Walter Reed Army Medical Center in Washington, D.C. from 25 August 2006 until 1 March 2007 when he was relieved of command in the wake of the Walter Reed neglect scandal over conditions at the medical center. He took command of the U.S. Army Medical Research and Materiel Command in November 2007.

Additional military schools include the Infantry Officer Basic \ Advanced Courses, the Army Medical Department Officer Basic \ Advanced Courses, Airborne and Jumpmaster Schools, the United States Army Command and General Staff College, and the United States Army War College.

Weightman is board certified by the American Board of Family Practice and is a Fellow in the American Academy of Family Physicians.

Weightman is married to the former Joan Peters from Youngstown, Ohio. They have three children.

The Army announced it had relieved of command Maj. Gen. Weightman, a physician who had headed the Walter Reed Army Medical Center for only six months. In a brief announcement, the Army said service leaders had "lost trust and confidence" in Weightman's leadership abilities "to address needed solutions for soldier outpatient care." It said the decision to fire him was made by Secretary of the Army Francis J. Harvey.

"I endorse the decision by Secretary of the Army Fran Harvey to relieve the Commander, Major General George W. Weightman of the Walter Reed Army Medical Center. The care and welfare of our wounded men and women in uniform demand the highest standard of excellence and commitment that we can muster as a government. When this standard is not met, I will insist on swift and direct corrective action and, where appropriate, accountability up the chain of command." -Defense Secretary Robert Gates.

Decorations and Badges
The Expert Infantryman Badge, Expert Field Medical Badge, Senior Parachutist Badge with combat star, Honduran Parachutist Badge. He is also a member of the Order of Military Medical Merit.

See also
Walter Reed Army Medical Center

References

External links
Army Medical Department biography

1951 births
Living people
People from Lamoille County, Vermont
United States Military Academy alumni
University of Vermont alumni
United States Army Medical Corps officers
United States Army Command and General Staff College alumni
United States Army War College alumni
Recipients of the Legion of Merit
United States Army generals
Recipients of the Distinguished Service Medal (US Army)